Unity, also called: Left Unity (Hungarian: Baloldali összefogás) was the informal name of a short-lived political alliance in Hungary of five political parties formed for contesting the 2014 Hungarian parliamentary election.

The parties involved were the Hungarian Socialist Party (MSZP), Together 2014 (E14), Democratic Coalition (DK), Dialogue for Hungary (PM) and Hungarian Liberal Party (MLP).

It was dissolved in aftermath of the alliance's poor results.

Members

Election results

See also 
 2014 Hungarian parliamentary election
 United for Hungary

References

2014 disestablishments in Hungary
2014 establishments in Hungary
Defunct political party alliances in Hungary
Hungarian Socialist Party
Political opposition organizations
Opposition to Viktor Orbán